Margo Stilley (born November 20, 1982) is an American actress having had roles in  How to Lose Friends & Alienate People (2008), Marple: Murder Is Easy and Hippie Hippie Shake (2009), The Trip (2010), and The Royals (2016). However, she is most remembered for appearing in her debut film 9 Songs (2004), which has been described as the most sexually explicit mainstream film ever produced in the UK.

Early life
Stilley was born in Conway, South Carolina, and grew up between there and Swansboro, North Carolina. She was raised in a strict Baptist household in America's Bible Belt. The day she turned 16 years of age, she moved out of her family home and lived on her own. She put herself through high school working as a telemarketer and a lifeguard until she graduated a year early from Conway High School with Honors in Art and History. She was voted "The Funniest" in the class of 2000. Stilley has been a long time supporter of hands-on charitable acts. In high school, she volunteered at local nursing homes feeding and reading to the elderly. She was offered a full scholarship to Savannah College of Art and Design, which she declined.

Career
She left the rural South as a teenager to begin working briefly as a model in Milan with Elite Model Management in February 2001, before moving to London by the end of the year, at the age of 18, to pursue her acting career.

Her first acting job was to star as Lisa, the lead actress in the controversial 2004 British film 9 Songs, directed by Michael Winterbottom. Her interest in art as a platform led to her decision to accept the role. According to the Guardian, 9 Songs was the most sexually explicit mainstream film to date, largely because it includes several scenes of real sexual acts between Stilley and her co-star, actor Kieran O'Brien. Her role is highly unusual in that she had unsimulated and very graphic sex with O'Brien, including genital fondling, female masturbation, with and without a vibrator, penetrative vaginal sex, cunnilingus, footjob and fellatio. During a scene in which Stilley stimulates his penis with her hand after performing fellatio on him, he became the only mainstream British actor who has been shown ejaculating in a mainstream UK-produced feature. The film screened in Cannes Film Festival and Sundance Film Festival and had a worldwide theatrical release. Stilley asked that director Michael Winterbottom refer to her simply by her character's name in interviews about the film at the beginning to protect the artistic integrity of the film.

Her second credit solidified her standing in Great Britain's indie film scene, when she starred in the satirical comedy Nathan Barley directed by Chris Morris for British television.

Stilley has since appeared in 19 American and British productions, including How to Lose Friends & Alienate People, with Simon Pegg and Jeff Bridges, and Agatha Christie's Marple (Murder Is Easy), with Benedict Cumberbatch, and has worked again with Winterbottom on a BBC Two comedy The Trip, with Steve Coogan and Rob Brydon.

She appeared as a model in feature articles in Vogue, In Style UK, The Face, Harper's Bazaar, Black Book Magazine and Elle. She has been a presenter at award shows, handing a Fashion Awards to Giles Deacon at the 2006 Elle Style Awards and presenting the New Designer Award to Christopher Kane at the 2007 British Fashion Awards.

In 2010, she signed on to play Lady Furness in Madonna's film WE, but renounced the role because of artistic differences.

Stilley officially converted to Judaism in 2015 "because of its strong sense of family and of history, and its belief that humans were formed in the image of God and are inherently divine". She was first published in the "News Review" section of The Sunday Times in an article titled "It's a Strange Time to Become a Jew", defending her choice to explore the Jewish faith. She was then commissioned by Esquire to write a series of articles based on her life. One is about a band of gypsies she came across and befriended, who breed white lions in Hanover, Germany. Another is about a biker bar in South Carolina in which she once worked named Suck Bang Blow, which is now the subject of a reality TV show she is producing under the same name.

Personal life
Stilley had strong ties to the Children's Charity Dramatic Need. In 2009, she travelled on her own to Johannesburg and the greater Gauteng province in South Africa to teach drama in some of the country's most challenged communities for three months. She has never publicized her charitable contributions.

Stilley lived in Mayfair, London until 2013 and she currently resides in Los Angeles.

Selected filmography 
 9 Songs (2004) ... Lisa
 Mayo (1 episode, 2006) ... Roma Sheraton
 Reverb (2007) ... Nicky
 How to Lose Friends & Alienate People (2008) ... Ingrid
 Marple: Murder Is Easy (2009) (TV) ... Bridget Conway
 Goal! 3 (2009) ... Tamsin
 Hippie Hippie Shake (2009) ... Cynthia Plaster Caster
 14 Days with Victor (2010) ... Anna
 The Trip (2010) ... Mischa
 Across Time I Cry (2014) ... Lisabet
 Darknet Delivery: A Silk Road Story (2015) ... Anna
 Still Waters (2015) ... Bradbury 
 Everything Carries Me to You ... Vicki
 The Royals (2016) ... Harper
 The Trip to Spain (series 3 of The Trip) (2017) ... Mischa
 The Host (2020) ... Sarah

References

External links
 
 

1982 births
Female models from South Carolina
Actresses from South Carolina
American film actresses
American expatriate actresses in the United Kingdom
American expatriates in England
Converts to Judaism from Baptist denominations
Living people
People from Myrtle Beach, South Carolina
21st-century American women
People from Mayfair